Kathy Yuen, better known as Tong Yee is an actress from Hong Kong. She is signed under the Emperor Entertainment Group label. She was cast as a helper girl in Beautiful Cooking in 2006 prior to becoming an actress.  In 2021, Kathy announced her pregnancy and wedding with Shing Mak.

Filmography

Film

Television series

References

External links

Kathy Yuen on Sina Weibo
Kathy Yuen on Instagram
Kathy's Xanga

1988 births
Living people
21st-century Hong Kong actresses
Hong Kong film actresses